Lounis Matem ( – 5 November 2013), also known as Lounis Mattem, was an Algerian footballer, who primarily played as a midfielder or a forward.

Death
He died on 5 November 2013, aged 71 or 72, in his hometown of Sétif, Sétif Province.

References

External links
 

1941 births
2013 deaths
Footballers from Sétif
Algerian footballers
Association football midfielders
Algeria international footballers
ES Sétif players
CR Belouizdad players
21st-century Algerian people